Joseph Addison Anyan is a Ghanaian politician and was a member of the first parliament of the second Republic of Ghana. He represented Agona constituency under the membership of the Progress Party (PP).

Early life and education 
Anyan was born on 1 October 1908. He attended Presbyterian Training College and University of London  where he obtained his Teachers' Training Certificate, Catechiste Certificate and London University Associate respectively. He worked as a teacher before going into parliament.

Personal life 
Anyan is a Christian and a Teacher.

Politics 
He began his political career in 1969 when he became the parliamentary candidate for the Progress Party (PP) to represent his constituency in the Central Region of Ghana prior to the commencement of the 1969 Ghanaian parliamentary election.

He was sworn into the First Parliament of the Second Republic of Ghana on 1 October 1969, after being pronounced winner at the 1969 Ghanaian election held on 26 August 1969 and was later suspended following the overthrow of the Busia government on 13 January 1972.

References 

Alumni of the University of London
1908 births
Progress Party (Ghana) politicians
Ghanaian MPs 1969–1972
People from Central Region (Ghana)
Date of death unknown
Ghanaian Christians